In 2016, the Sunwolves participated in the 2016 Super Rugby competition, their first ever appearance in the competition.

Personnel

Coaches and management

The Sunwolves coaching and management staff for the 2016 Super Rugby season were:

Squad

The following players were named in the Sunwolves squad for the 2016 Super Rugby season:

Log

Matches

The Sunwolves played the following matches during the 2016 Super Rugby season:

Player statistics

The Super Rugby appearance record for players that represented the Sunwolves in 2016 is as follows:

Squad members Ryuhei Arita, Shohei Hirano, Tsuyoshi Murata and Kazuhiko Usami made no appearances in the competition.

See also

 Sunwolves
 2016 Super Rugby season

References

2016
2016 Super Rugby season by team
2015–16 in Japanese rugby union
2016–17 in Japanese rugby union